Ruth Sato (1904–1992) was a Broadway chorus dancer, gossip columnist, musician promoter and nightclub manager. She was known as the first Japanese chorus girl on Broadway, where she worked for 20 years. She worked for about ten years as a gossip columnist and musician promoter and for 25 years managing Jazz, Ltd., a Chicago Dixieland jazz nightclub, with her husband, Bill Reinhardt.

Family 
Ruth was born in Manhattan, New York City, New York to a Japanese father, Masazo Sato, and an Irish mother, Grace Bedeliah McIntyre. She said in the press that she inherited her Japanese father's stoicism and her Irish mother's volatility. Her father was a successful art importer, florist and antique dealer in Manhattan. Ruth is related to the 39th Prime Minister of Japan, Eisaku Satō. Ruth's grand-nephew, Alastar McNeil, is a performer with the Beatles tribute band, RAIN. While Ruth lived with her parents in Manhattan, her father took her on many trips to Japan for her to learn her cultural heritage. In high school Ruth's ambition was to be a school teacher (she studied education for less than a year at Barnard College in New York). Her vocational guide enlightened Ruth that her status as a Japanese teacher in a white country may not be taken seriously. The guide inquired: "What school do you think might hire you?" On the advice of this guide and her father, Ruth became a dancer. Ruth liked French and Russian literature and she read James Joyce, Marcel Proust and the Goncourt brothers. In her youth she was fascinated with American entertainment but dismissive of Japanese artifacts.

When in 1950 Ruth asked a reporter, "Why should I bring kids into the world to bat their heads against a wall?" she metaphorically suggests that children cannot rationalize society's prejudice against their mixed race origin. Ruth's Irish mother, Della, was ostracized by her family when she married Ruth's Japanese father, Masazo. To ensure that parents of white children whom Masazo's children socialized with did not worry about them marrying an oriental person in the future, Masazo moved his family frequently. The resultant feeling of unsettledness lasted throughout Ruth's life.

Acclaimed beauty 
In her prime, Ruth was a petite 104 pounds and 5'-1" tall with measurements of 34-24-34 ½ and was a 'beautiful Japanese star." Columnist Walter Winchell called her "the Japanese doll with brains." Billy Rose called her "the most beautiful Eurasion in the world." She was prideful of her Irish-Japanese heritage: "… For extreme beauty I think the Eurasian type takes the prize. The Eurasian, you know, has the characteristics and the features of both the Caucasian and the Oriental." In 1936 Ruth declined an offer by Vanity Fair to enter a national beauty contest on the premise that love, affection and character are far more important factors than beauty. During her show business years she wore the popular 1920s bob cut and bangs hairdo. Many of her promotional photos in scantily clad attire accentuate her figure.

Dancing 
Ruth entered show business about 1923 when her friend, Blanche Mehaffey, told of her fun experiences at the Ziegfeld Follies. Ruth dropped out of Barnard College and signed a contract to dance chorus at the New York Hippodrome theater (three miles from her house).  She then sought out and performed at many of the top New York City nightclubs, speakeasies and Broadway theaters until the mid-1940s, including: the original Cotton Club, Savoy Ballroom, Onyx Club, Reisenweber's Cafe, Adrian's Tap Room, Smalls Paradise, Helen Morgan's 54th Street Club, The Nest, Nick's, and Leon & Eddie's. She was the first Japanese performer on Broadway and one of the first chorus girls who sought to produce her own Broadway show. From 1922 to 1936 she worked as a chorus girl, singing and dancing in musicals. Early on Ruth worked for Broadway producer Vinton Freedley then for Arthur Hammerstein and then for Billy Rose (1931-1935). Ruth performed in at least eight Broadway musicals: "Song of the Flame", "The Wild Rose", "Lady Do", "Funny Face," "Hold Everything," "Sweet and Low," "Billy Rose’s Crazy Quilt", and "Heads Up." The highly acclaimed shows were: Funny Face, Hold Everything!, Song of the Flame, Heads Up, and George White's Scandals.

Famous co-stars
Some of the notable vaudevillian performers she worked with include:  Fanny Brice (Crazy Quilt, Sweet and Low) Fred and Adele Astaire (Funny Face), Milton Berle (Casino de Paree theater-restaurant), Bert Lahr (Hold Everything), Jimmy Durante (Casino de Paree theater-restaurant), George Jessel (Sweet and Low),  Victor Moore (Funny Face, Hold Everything, Heads Up), Eleanor Powell (Crazy Quilt road tour, and Casino de Paree theater-restaurant), Ann Pennington (Crazy Quilt), Anita Page (Crazy Quilt), Ray Bolger (Heads Up) and Sterling Holloway (East Wind). In 1932 The Japan Times awarded Ruth a prize for being the most popular Japanese woman in America.

Other nightclub engagements 
Beginning in December 1933 Ruth worked as a dancer for producer Billy Rose at his theater-restaurant, Casino de Paree, on 54th street near Broadway. There, Ruth met the novelist John O’Hara, with whom she had an affair. In June 1936 she was working at The Penthouse nightclub in Boston. By December 1939, songwriter George MacKinnon introduced Ruth to the famous nightclub, Leon & Eddie's on 52nd Street, where she played stooge to "Eddie Davis" and danced. In May 1941 Ruth was dancing at Ching's Waikiki club on 52nd Street. She was also dancing at the Chinese nightclub, Forbidden City, on 58th Street, which featured American music by an all Chinese cast. Ruth helped to start this club.

Musical productions and solo debut
Ruth performed in one of George White's Scandals and may have been in one of the Ziegfeld Follies. She performed in a Casino de Paree road tour in 1934.

Ruth said she was lucky and happy to be a chorus girl (for 13 years), but she couldn't advance beyond chorus line work since producers had "typed" her in this role, stymieing her. In Ruth's words: "...although I am an American, born in New York, I would like to do something to show that it's possible for one of eastern blood to make a success in the western amusement world…" After four years of trying, Ruth's big break came in June 1935, when she met producer Harry Gourfain at the Metropolitan Theater in Boston. For the show ‘Round the World Cruise,’  Ruth persuaded Gourfain to allow her to do specialty tap dancing in jazz numbers. She succeeded. Ruth later danced ballet: in "Song of the Flame" in 1936, with choreographer Lew Christensen, in "East Wind," an allegorical ballet at the St. Louis Municipal Opera, in August, 1940 and later with Sterling Holloway in the roadshow version.

Prospective producer 
In April 1929 Ruth bought the Japanese rights to ‘Hold Everything’ from producers Alex Aarons and Vinton Freedley so she could produce her own Japanese version of the American show for Japanese patrons at the Imperial Theater in Japan. She was to be the first-ever to introduce an American vaudeville show to Japan. She had many of the details planned—the costumes, the translated Japanese lyrics, the financial backing, help from her father, technical and musical directors, etc. This was widely written about in the press. However, the October 1929 stock market crash and the subsequent Depression halted her plans.

Music promoter 
In the course of over 20 years, Ruth had the opportunity to learn much about the nightclub business.  It is reported that she knew all of the members of the Count Basie, Duke Ellington, Benny Goodman and Jimmie Lunceford bands. She also worked as a gossip columnist for Down Beat jazz magazine under Ned Williams, for The Boston Record under George MacKinnon (1938), for Swing magazine under Barry Ulanov and for The Boston Post.  She was a publicist for the Count Basie Orchestra in the late ‘30s. She worked with George Avakian and Jack Jenny when he recorded "Stardust" with his band. She did publicity for about 90% of all swing bands of the 1930s, including Count Basie, Woody Herman, Mary Lou Williams, Bobby Hackett and others.

Marriages 
Ruth was married twice, first to the Hungarian director, Gustave Basco, from 1931 to 1936, then to jazz musician, Bill Reinhardt from 1942 until her death in 1992.  Ruth never had children. She met Bill at the oriental Forbidden City nightclub in New York City at which both were performing. They were married two weeks after they met in June 1942 in Norfolk, Virginia, where he was stationed in the military.

Nightclub manager 
Bill and Ruth made plans to start their own jazz nightclub when Bill entered the Navy during World War II. They agreed upon a high class operation, devoid of influence from the mob, rowdy people, drugs and prostitution, which were quite common in nightclubs of the 1940s. Ruth was well aware that New York's 52nd Street developed a bad reputation for this, having worked there since the early 1920s. Jazz Ltd's motto was clear: "If you want to dance, go to the Aragon Ballroom. If you want to drink, try any bar. You can make love in a taxi. But if you want to hear Dixieland, this is the place."  No unescorted women were allowed unless they sat with Ruth at the bar. Men had to wear suit jackets and women could not wear trousers. Ruth did the marketing, booking, was the hostess, and enforced the rules.

In June 1947, they opened Jazz, Ltd. in Chicago, which featured Dixieland Jazz of the 1910s and ‘20s and top jazz musicians from across the country. Ruth and Bill were originally going to open a club in New York but Dixieland music was dead there after World War I, so they chose Chicago. With Ruth’s extensive Broadway experience and her own publicity, she booked talent and attracted customers from around the world to Jazz, Ltd. Some of the greatest names in Jazz played at Jazz, Ltd. Ruth and Bill estimated that over 700 musicians played their. While Ruth managed the club, Bill played clarinet in the band. It was open six nights per week from 9 pm to 4 am and was busy all the time, except for holidays."Ruth remembered many people’s names and faces and her hospitality made for good rapport. Her ability to preside over the club with a subtle yet firm hand made Jazz, Ltd. one of the most pleasant clubs in Chicago.
Ruth and Bill knew they had to devote all of their time to Jazz, Ltd. in order for it to succeed. Ruth took only one vacation in 17 years working 48 hours per week at Jazz, Ltd. When it closed early in the morning she went up to her residence, an apartment above the club, and made breakfast for Bill and herself. Then she tended her garden in the backyard.

Personality 
Ruth was entrepreneurial, gracious, and outgoing. Studs Terkel referred to Ruth as "the most colorful character I know in Chicago."

She was honorable. Whenever speaking of her husband, Bill, she never hesitated to laud him. She was proud of his accomplishments and frequently boasted to reporters that "Outside of Nick’s in New York…he is the only jazz musician in the country who has owned his own place since 1940."   She effectively charmed local journalist friends year after year to write positive news articles about Jazz, Ltd. She was eternally grateful to all of those persons who helped make her and Bill's jazz club a success. She always wrote back to journalists to thank them for their articles on Jazz, Ltd.

Ruth frequently laughed self-mockingly at her own sarcasm. "It’s an advantage to be tone-deaf if you spend eight hours a night, six nights a week in a Dixieland jazz club."  "[Ruth] has no musical talent and couldn’t care less." The music that enthralls Jazz, Ltd. customers "could be so many pile drivers as far as I’m concerned."

She steadfastly held to her convictions and was always optimistic. Ruth had always known that she had to work hard for everything she wanted.  She had an incessant desire for money. "Everything I ever did, I did for dough. I learned quick that nobody was going to give me anything." As emcee of a new night club, Ruth entertained with wit and some risque without superlatives, as is historically common with emcees.  In reference to taking criticism while upholding a no foolishness policy at Jazz, Ltd., Ruth said her "shell is thick." She often took in stride criticism for the way she managed Jazz, Ltd.

She was an astute businesswoman. Always keen to know the competition to Jazz, Ltd., Ruth kept close track of which jazz nightclubs opened and closed in Chicago, frequently mentioning in the press how many of them that Jazz, Ltd. had outlasted. "We run the business very tightly; we’ve always had a little money in the bank for that bad time. You don’t buy airplanes. You don’t go to Europe on trips…you stick with it." She was awarded $35,000 when she divorced Gus Basco in 1936. When Sidney Bechet played for a Chicago competitor to Jazz, Ltd and broke his Jazz, Ltd. contract, Ruth won a $5,000 breach of contract award against him and Sidney never played in Chicago again. In 1929 she got financial backing from banks in New York to produce her own show in Japan, which had never before been done by a chorus girl.

Retirement and death 
When Jazz, Ltd. permanently closed in 1972, Bill continued doing stints with his band in Chicago. He and Ruth retired to San Diego in 1978. Ruth died from complications of chronic obstructive pulmonary disease on December 9, 1992, three days before her 88th  birthday.  Her cremains were given to her husband, who had her ashes scattered over Long Island, New York.

Notes and references
Notes

References

Further reading
Adrian’s Tap Room
Aarons
Gustave Basco
Billy Rose’s Crazy Quilt
Eddie Davis
Harry Gourfain
Helen Morgan’s 54th Street Club
Leon & Eddie’s
Lady Do
Nick’s
Reisenweber’s Café
Song of the Flame
The Wild Rose
Ned Williams

Bibliography

 

Dancers from New York (state)
Vaudeville performers
American gossip columnists
American women columnists
Barnard College alumni
People from Manhattan
American people of Irish descent
American people of Japanese descent
1904 births
1992 deaths
Nightclub managers
American dancers of Asian descent
American female dancers
20th-century American dancers
20th-century American women